River Landing Village is a mixed-use development in Saskatoon, Saskatchewan, Canada consisting of 4 highrises. Located on the southern tip of downtown Saskatoon between the Victoria and Idylwyld bridges, the site has long been the most expensive and most sought for pieces of real estate in Saskatoon. Victory Majors Investments Corporation has been overseeing the project. This development has gone through significant changes and gone through 2 different developers over a span of 10 years.

Site Tender
The site (called parcel Y) is part of River Landing Phase 1, an initiative by the City of Saskatoon to redevelop the south downtown region along the South Saskatchewan River.

The tender process for the site was complex, and underwent the following delay:
 March 2007 - Remai Ventures pulls out of plan to build a destination hotel and spa on the site
 June 2007 - Lake Placid Investments led by  CEO Michael E Lobsinger expresses an interest in submits bid for the River Landing Village complex
 September 2007 - The Lake Placid bid is the only one submitted for the $4.8 Million Canadian parcel
 January 2008 - The Sale if approved by the city
 September 2008 - Plans are approved by the city and the Meewasin Valley Authority
 January 2009 - Lake Placid misses the payment deadline on the parcel, an extension is given
 August 2009 - Lake Placid misses the payment deadline on the parcel, an extension is given
 October 31, 2009 - Lake Placid misses the payment deadline on the parcel and forfeits the deposit
 November 2009 - Lake Placid asks for an extension,
 March 2010 -  Lake Placid and Victory Majors Investments led by Karim Nasser, approach the city to try and resurrect the project with Marriott Hotels attending the presentation to council
 April 2010 - City reappraises the land at $11 million
 June 2010 - The city enters into an agreement to sell the property for $5.2 Million
 November 2010 - Victory Majors Investments buys out Lake Placid's interest in the project
 August 12, 2011 - Victory Majors proposes a major overhaul to original design to include a 27-story residential tower, a 17-story office tower, and a 10-story hotel tower.

Specifications 
The complex consists of:
 13 story mixed-use residential tower
 10 story hotel tower (including two restaurants, and banquet/multi-purpose space)
 18 and 13 story office tower, the taller of which is the tallest in the province
 shared partially underground parkade with 620 stalls
  of retail split between the various buildings in the complex
 plaza with large tree and water feature

See also 
 List of tallest buildings in Saskatoon

Notes

External links 
 Project Website
 

Buildings and structures in Saskatoon